Scaphidiinae is a subfamily of Staphylinidae.

Anatomy
Broadly oval, compact, long slender legs.
Elytra long, cover all but last few abdominal segments
Tarsi 5-5-5.

Ecology
Habitat: found on fungi, and slime molds.
Collection Method: check fungi and slime molds.
Biology: entire subfamily is mycophagous, most diverse in the tropics.

Systematics
Seven genera and 70 species in North America.

References

External links

Scaphidiinae at Bugguide.net. 

Staphylinidae
Beetle subfamilies